Chilanga is a constituency of the National Assembly of Zambia. It covers a rural area to the south and west of Lusaka, including the towns of Chilanga and Mwembeshi, in Chilanga District.

List of MPs

References

Constituencies of the National Assembly of Zambia
1973 establishments in Zambia
Constituencies established in 1973